Jessica Smith may refer to:

Jessica Smith (editor) (1895–1983), American activist and editor
Jessica Smith (speed skater) (born 1983), Olympic short track speed skater from the United States
Jessica Smith (athlete) (born 1989), Canadian track and field athlete
Jessica Smith (swimmer), Australian Paralympic swimmer
Jessica Smith (actress), portrayed the  "Sun Baby" in Teletubbies
Jessica Grace Smith (born 1988), New Zealand actress

See also
Jessie Smith (disambiguation)
Jesse Smith (disambiguation)